Sophie Stewart (5 March 1908 – 6 June 1977) was a British actress of stage and screen.

Biography
She was born as Sophia Lyal Drummond Stewart in Crieff, Perthshire, Scotland in March 1908 and died in June 1977 at the age of 69, in Cupar, Fife, Scotland. 

In 1937 she starred in Return of the Scarlet Pimpernel as Lady Blakeney. Her West End stage appearances included James Bridie's A Sleeping Clergyman (1933), Aimée Stuart's Lady from Edinburgh (1945) and J. Lee Thompson's The Human Touch (1948).

She was married to the actor Ellis Irving.

Filmography

References

External links
 

1908 births
1977 deaths
20th-century Scottish actresses
20th-century British actresses
People from Crieff
Scottish film actresses
Scottish stage actresses
Scottish television actresses
British film actresses
British stage actresses
British television actresses